Krisztina Bácsics (born 22 November 1973) is a Hungarian sailor. She competed in the Europe event at the 1992 Summer Olympics.

References

1973 births
Living people
Sportspeople from Keszthely
Hungarian female sailors (sport)
Olympic sailors of Hungary
Sailors at the 1992 Summer Olympics – Europe